The women's 4 × 100 metres relay event at the 1991 Summer Universiade was held at the Don Valley Stadium in Sheffield on 25 July 1991.

Results

References

Athletics at the 1991 Summer Universiade
1991